FACP may mean:

 Fellow of the American College of Physicians
 Fellow of the American College of Prosthodontists
 Fellow of the Australasian College of Pharmacy
 Fire alarm control panel
 Front for Joint Provisional Action, in the Chadian–Libyan conflict